was an airlifted special forces unit of the Imperial Japanese Army formed from Army paratroopers, in November 1944 as a last-ditch attempt to reduce and delay Allied bombing raids on the Japanese home islands. The Giretsu Special Forces unit was commanded by Lieutenant General Michio Sugahara.

History

After USAAF B-29 Superfortress strategic bombers began attacks on Tokyo from bases in the Mariana Islands, the 1st Raiding Brigade of the Teishin Shudan was ordered to form a commando unit for a "special operations" mission to attack and destroy the bombers on the Aslito Airfield on Saipan. Captain Michiro Okuyama, commander of the brigade's engineering company and trained in sabotage and demolition was selected as mission leader, and he selected an additional 126 men from his own team (1st Teishin-Dan 1st Regiment 4th Company) to form the first Giretsu Airborne Unit. It was initially organized with a command section and five platoons and one independent squad, based at the IJA air academy at Saitama. The group unit also included eight intelligence officers and two radio men from the Nakano School.

Tactics
The Giretsu operations were to be undertaken at night, beginning with air strikes by bombers. After this, commando units would be inserted onto the target airfield by crash landing their transports. The fact that there was no provision for extraction of the strike force, along with the rejection of surrender in Japanese military doctrine at the time, meant that the Giretsu ground operations were effectively suicide attacks.

Operations
The attack against the Marianas was scheduled for 24 December 1944, but was called off after American raids damaged the planned refueling airfields on Iwo Jima. After the Marianas raid was cancelled plans were made to attack airfields on Iwo Jima captured by the United States Marine Corps in March, but these too were cancelled when the Iwo Jima garrison fell.

On 1 April, US forces landed on Okinawa, and American fighters based on Okinawa's west coast intercepted and shot down many kamikaze aircraft attacking the American fleet. In the middle of April, the Sixth Air Army requested the deployment of the Giretsu Special Forces to neutralize these airfields, in what was designated "Operation Gi-gou". On 18 May, this was authorized.

On the night of 24 May 1945, 12 Ki-21-IIbs of the Daisan Dokuritsu Hikōtai ("3rd Independent Squadron": 32 crew members commanded by Captain Chuichi Suwabe) were dispatched for a strike, each with 14 commandos. Eight were assigned to attack Yontan and four to Kadena. Four aircraft aborted the mission with engine problems, and three more were shot down; however, five managed to crash-land at Yontan Airfield during the confusion caused by a diversionary attack by some 50 IJAAF and IJN bombers and fighters.

Only one plane landed successfully. About 10 surviving raiders, armed with submachine guns and various explosives then wreaked havoc on the supplies and nearby aircraft, killed two US servicemen, destroyed  of fuel and nine aircraft, and damaged 29 more before being nearly annihilated by the defenders. One member of the raiding party survived and was able to make his way across the battlefield, reaching the Thirty-Second Army Headquarters (Okinawa) around 12 June.

A second large-scale attack on bases in the Marianas with the specific intent of destroying B-29 Superfortress bombers was again planned with 60 transports and 900 commandos for the nights of 19–23 August 1945 (Operation Ken-gou). On 15 August, Japan surrendered and the operation was canceled.

Uniforms and equipment
Giretsu personnel wore special hand-made camouflage uniforms made from Ink, and carried special equipment. Most were armed with Type 100 submachine guns, Type 99 rifles, Type 99 light machine guns, and Type 30 bayonets, Type 89 grenade dischargers, Type 99 grenades and Type 99 mines, as well as Type 94 8 mm pistols.

See also
Commando
Teishin Shudan
Raid on Yontan Airfield
Japanese marine paratroopers of World War II
Kaoru Special Attack Corps

Notes

References

External links

 Nippon News, No. 252. in the official website of NHK. "Giretsu Kuteibutai".

Military history of Japan during World War II
Military units and formations of the Imperial Japanese Army
Japanese World War II special forces
Airborne units and formations
World War II suicide weapons of Japan